Euphaedra leloupi is a butterfly in the family Nymphalidae. It is found in the Democratic Republic of the Congo (Lomami and Lualaba).

References

Butterflies described in 1955
leloupi
Endemic fauna of the Democratic Republic of the Congo
Butterflies of Africa